Akalathe Ambili is a 1985 Indian Malayalam film,  directed by Jeassy and produced by Thomas Mathew. The film stars Mammootty, Supriya Pathak, Rohini, Maniyanpilla Raju and Santhosh Kumar in the lead roles. The film has musical score by Shyam.

Cast
Mammootty as Ajayan
Supriya Pathak as Ambili
Rohini as Ashwathy
Maniyanpilla Raju as Maniyan
Santhosh as Edwin
Jose Prakash as Kariyachan
T. P. Madhavan as Menon
Shivaji as Thomas Kariya
Ajith Kollam as Aravind
Rajan P. Dev
N. F. Varghese as Police Officer
Sankaradi as Ambili's father
Mukesh as Ashokan
Thilakan as Kichettan
Rajasekharan as സി

Trivia
Supriya Pathak done title role 'Ambili' in this movie.

Soundtrack
The music was composed by Shyam and the lyrics were written by M. D. Rajendran.

References

External links
 

1985 films
1980s Malayalam-language films